Jwalpa Devi Temple is a shrine dedicated to the goddess Jwalpa.
It's situated on the bank of Nawalika River,34 km from Pauri on the main Pauri-Kotdwar road.

Festivals 
Every year two Navaratris are held, Chaitra and Shardiya ones. A fair is also held on  Basant Panchami. The Anthwal family is Caretaker of temple, a priest family lineage.

Legend 

According to a legend Adi Shankaracharya visited here prayed here. Being satisfied his prayer the goddess appeared here.

Another legend in According to Skandpurana, Shachi, the daughter of Daityaraj Pulom in Satyuga, had penned the austerity of Maa Parvati, the adhyaksh goddess of the Himalayas at Jwalpa Dham along the river Nayar to receive Devraj Indra as husband.

Mother Parvati rejoices over Shachi penance and fulfills her wish appeared as Deept Jwaleswari the name of place Jwalpa.

References

Shakti temples
Hindu temples in Uttarakhand
Buildings and structures in Kangra district